Robert Crane (born January 5, 1969) is an American musician who is the current bass guitarist of hard rock band Black Star Riders. He has also been a member of Ricky Warwick's band The Fighting Hearts. He was previously the bassist with the band Ratt.

Early life and career 
Crane moved to the Fairfax District of Hollywood, California, at the age of nine where he attended Bancroft Junior High and Fairfax high school. For his 14th birthday, his father bought him his first bass guitar from Fairfax Music School in Hollywood. Soon after, Crane and best friend Stuart Waldman were playing Hollywood clubs with their first band "Dream Suite" when they were only 16. Crane went on to work as bass technician for Bobby Dall of Poison from 1984–86. 

As a bassist, Crane played in local L.A. bands Lancia, Hot Wheelz, NEWHAVEN and Monroe (Rick Monroe), and has toured with Vince Neil's (Mötley Crüe) solo band featuring Steve Stevens, Dave Marshall and Vik Foxx. He also played with Stephen Pearcy and Al Pitrelli in Vertex and toured and recorded with Ratt.

Crane joined Black Star Riders in 2014, replacing their original bassist Marco Mendoza. He has also worked with Vince Neil and Adler's Appetite. In 2021, he filled in as the touring bass player for Warrant whilst Jerry Dixon took a break.

Discography

With Vince Neil Band 
 Carved in Stone (1995)

With Tuff 
 Fist First (studio bassist) (1994)
 Religious Fix (studio bassist) (1995)

With Ratt 
 Collage (1997)
 Ratt (1999)
 Infestation (2010)

With Adler's Appetite 
 Adler's Appetite (2005)

With Saints of the Underground 
 Love the Sin, Hate the Sinner (2008)

With Lynch Mob 
 Sun Red Sun (2014)

With Black Star Riders 
 The Killer Instinct (2015)
 Heavy Fire (2017)
 Another State of Grace (2019)
 Wrong Side of Paradise (2023)

References 

1969 births
Living people
American bass guitarists
Vince Neil Band members
Ratt members
Adler's Appetite members
20th-century American guitarists
Black Star Riders members